Garnham is a surname. Notable people with the surname include:

Cyril Garnham (1901–1994), British parasitologist
Mike Garnham (born 1960), English cricketer 
Nicholas Garnham (born 1937), media studies academic
Robin Garnham (born 1988), British handball player
Scott Garnham (born 1985), British actor and singer